Child of Mine is a British television drama thriller, written by Caleb Ranson and directed by Jamie Payne, that first broadcast on ITV on 13 November 2005. Starring Joanne Whalley and Adrian Dunbar in the title roles, Child of Mine follows childless couple Tess (Whalley) and Alfie Palmer (Dunbar), who adopt two sisters from Canada whose mother was murdered by an unknown intruder. Older sister Heather (Hannah Lochner) is having trouble coming to terms with her mother's death, and Tess begins to wonder if it was Heather herself who killed her mother, and travels with her back to Canada to discover the truth.

Child of Mine attracted 6.25 million viewers on its debut broadcast. Child of Mine was released on Region 1 DVD in the United States on 8 September 2006 via Koch Vision.

Plot
London couple Tess and Alfie Palmer cannot have their own children. They adopt two girls who are orphans from a Canadian, non-state-recognised placement agency. The mother of the children was murdered two years ago. Four-year-old Grace looks carefree, bright and fun-loving, whereas ten-year-old Heather is more depressed and serious. As time goes on, Heather proves stubborn and even violent. But adoptive mother Tess does not despair, as her training as a child psychologist leads her to believe that Heather appears to have a secret. Therapy talks with a colleague bring no progress, so she decides on a daring venture - a return to the scene of the crime in the hope of getting Heather to talk. She now considers it a possibility that Heather could have murdered her own mother.

Tess travels to Canada with Heather, and decides they should visit the empty house of Heather's mother, which proves very uncomfortable for Heather. Nevertheless, she begins to describe the scene with tears to Tess. During the subsequent short visit to the adoption agency, Heather recognises the culprit by means of a gesture. It is the owner of the agency, Alvin. Meanwhile, in an unattended moment, Tess rummages through a number of files. Astonishingly, each file consistently includes the note that the parent of the child being mediated is dead. Tess becomes suspicious. When the police sheriff arrives to interview him, Alvin shoots him dead. He also wants to eliminate Tess and Heather as witnesses. But Tess proves defensive, using the weapon used to kill the sheriff to injure Alvin and put him out of action, allowing her and Heather to escape.

Cast
 Joanne Whalley as Tess Palmer
 Adrian Dunbar as Alfie Palmer
 Hannah Lochner as Heather McGill
 Stevie Gillespie as Grace McGill
 Stacey Zurburg as Jane McGill
 Travis McConnell as Stf. Sgt. Pyro
 Sylvia Syms as Alice Palmer
 Barry Flatman as Alvin
 Eve Crawford as Nora
 Don S. Davis as Pol. Ch. Hartman
 Shaun Dooley as Simon
 Sam Friend as Charlie
 Christianne Hirt as Denise
 Clare Holman as Karen

Reception
Both the Lexicon of International Film and Prisma praised the convincing play by Hannah Lochner, commenting; "In addition to Joanne Whalley in the role of the new mother, Hannah Lochner in the role of Heather is especially convincing. With her expressive yet sensitive game, she steals the show off Whalley in every scene they perform together."

Prism added; "Unobtrusive but solid staged crime drama, played convincingly especially in the role of the older daughter." Hannah Lochner was nominated for Best Performance in an International Feature Film - Leading Young Performer at the 27th Young Artist Award for her role as Heather McGill.

References

External links

2005 television films
2005 films
British television films
ITV television dramas
Television series by Endemol
2000s English-language films